Laurie Notaro (born October 1965 in Brooklyn, New York)  is a #1 New York Times best-selling American writer. Notaro was raised in Phoenix, Arizona,  She graduated from Arizona State University with a degree in journalism.  She co-founded Planet Magazine, and was a senior editor at Tucson Monthly, a full-color city magazine. Notaro was a columnist for ten years at The Arizona Republic. In October 2001, The Idiot Girls’ Action Adventure Club was picked up by Random House which resulted in eleven books. She published with Simon & Schuster with "Crossing the Horizon" and "Potty Mouth at the Table". Her latest book, "Excuse Me While I Disappear," is published by Little A and is a collection of musings on a Gen X-er becoming an AARP-er. Numerous articles, essays, and novels have followed, and she was a finalist for The Thurber Award for American Humor. She has written for The New York Times, Glamour, Oprah, BARK Magazine, USA Today, Village Voice Media, and BUST. She currently lives in Eugene, Oregon with her husband.

Works

Novels

There's a (Slight) Chance I Might Be Going to Hell: A Novel of Sewer Pipes, Pageant Queens, and Big Trouble (May 29, 2007)
Spooky Little Girl (April 13, 2010)
"Crossing the Horizon" (October 4, 2016)

Essay collections

The Idiot Girls' Action-Adventure Club: True Tales from a Magnificent and Clumsy Life (July 2, 2002)
Autobiography of a Fat Bride: True Tales of a Pretend Adulthood (July 8, 2003)
I Love Everybody (and Other Atrocious Lies): True Tales of a Loudmouth Girl (June 8, 2004)
We Thought You Would Be Prettier: True Tales of the Dorkiest Girl Alive (April 19, 2005)
An Idiot Girl's Christmas: True Tales from the Top of the Naughty List (November 1, 2005)
The Idiot Girl and the Flaming Tantrum of Death: Reflections on Revenge, Germophobia, and Laser Hair Removal (June 24, 2008)
It Looked Different on the Model: Epic Tales of Impending Shame and Infamy (July 26, 2011)
The Potty Mouth at the Table (May 7, 2013)
"Enter Pirates" Vintage Legends, (August, 2015)
"Housebroken" (July, 2016)
"Predictably Disastrous Results: Vintage Legends Volume II" (August 2016)
Excuse Me While I Disappear (November 2022)

References

External links 

Laurie Notaro. Facebook Page.
Laurie Notaro. Twitter Page

American women writers
Living people
Year of birth uncertain
21st-century American women
Year of birth missing (living people)